The Little Kidnappers is a 1990 Canadian/American television film made by Testar Productions, Margellos-Resnick and Jones 21st Century for the Canadian Broadcasting Corporation and the Disney Channel. It tells the story of orphans Harry and Davy MacKenzie (Leo Wheatley and Charles Miller), who are sent to live with their stern grandfather, James MacKenzie (Charlton Heston).

Based on the short story "Scotch Settlement" by Neil Paterson (previously filmed in 1953), set in Nova Scotia in 1903, the film was shot in several locations throughout Nova Scotia with dockside scenes being filmed aboard the CSS Acadia at the Maritime Museum of the Atlantic in Halifax.

Plot

Coralee Elliott Testar's version of the story revolves around letters written by James' son to his wife and children. Harry and Davy have brought them in a box James had carved for his son many years before. Through these letters, James begins to find healing from his grief over the death of his son at the hands of Dutch soldiers in the Second Boer War in South Africa, deliverance from the hatred in his heart for neighboring Dutch farmers, and acceptance of his daughter's love for the village doctor who is also of Dutch heritage.

The movie's title refers to the discovery and rescue by Harry and Davy of the neighbor's baby briefly left unattended on a beach and their decision to hide and care for it themselves rather than risk their grandfather's harsh and unmerciful reaction to it.

Awards

The 1990 film received broad international distribution and has been nominated for numerous awards, winning the prestigious Banff World Media Rockie Award.

References

External links 
 

1990 films
1990 television films
1990 drama films
English-language Canadian films
Disney Channel original films
Films scored by Mark Snow
Films about orphans
Films based on short fiction
Films directed by Donald Shebib
Films set in 1903
Films set in Nova Scotia
Films shot in Nova Scotia
Canadian drama television films
American drama television films
1990s American films
1990s Canadian films